Würzburg American High School (or WAHS) was located in Würzburg, Germany on Leighton Barracks. The school opened in 1954.  The school was part of the U.S. Department of Defense Dependent School system. It was a medium-sized school - in 1964 the senior class comprised about 42 students. With the closure of Leighton Barracks in 2008 and the departure of most units from the area, the senior class in 2007 was much smaller, and the school closed in 2008.

The school consisted mostly of U.S. military dependents and children of the teachers.

Military Communities Served 
 Kitzingen
 Würzburg
 Giebelstadt
 Schweinfurt
 Bad Kissingen
 Wertheim
 Wildflecken

Notable alumni 
 Anthony Brown - NFL player
 Mike Brown - NBA head coach (Los Angeles Lakers and Cleveland Cavaliers)
 Tobin "TC" Costen - Music and Film Producer - No Limit Records, Short Stop Records, and Me & Mine Entertainment

References

External links 

Wurzburg Alumni Association
WAHS Yearbooks Online
American Overseas Schools Historical Society

High schools in Germany
International schools in Germany
Schools in Bavaria
Educational institutions established in 1954
Educational institutions disestablished in 2008
Defunct schools in Germany
1954 establishments in West Germany
2008 disestablishments in Germany